Kim Won-jin (born 1 December 1968) is a South Korean long jumper.

He won the gold medal at the 1987 Asian Championships and the bronze medal at the 1989 Asian Championships.

His personal best jump is 8.03 metres, achieved in June 1987 in Seoul. This is the current South Korean record.

References

1968 births
Living people
South Korean male long jumpers